Marcien Towa  (January 5, 1931 – July 2, 2014) was a Cameroonian philosopher. He is considered one of the icons of African philosophy in the twentieth century.

References

1931 births
2014 deaths
Cameroonian philosophers
People from Centre Region (Cameroon)
Living people